The following is a list of water parks in Asia sorted by region.

Bangladesh 
 Fantasy Kingdom, Dhaka
 Sea World, Chittagong

Brunei 
 Jerudong Park Playground, Bandar Seri Begawan
 Liang Lumut Recreation Club, Kuala Belait

China 
 Aquaventure Waterpark, Sanya (part of Atlantis Sanya)
 Chime Long Water Park, Guangzhou
 Li'an Ocean Harbor Theme Park, Lingshui
 Water Cube, Beijing
 Wet'n'Wild Haikou, Haikou

India 

 Accoland, Guwahati
 Amaazia, Surat
 Anandi Water Park, Lucknow, Uttar Pradesh
 Aqua Marina Water Parks and Resorts, Kolkata
 Aqua Village, pinjore
 Aquamagica, Adlabs Imagica, Khopoli
 Aquatica,  Kolkata
 Bellilious Park, Kolkata
 Black Thunder (theme park), Coimbatore, Tamil Nadu
 Dash n Splash, Chennai, Tamil Nadu
 Dolphin the Water World, Agra (U.P.)
 Dream World, Thrissur, Kerala
 Fantasy Park, Palakkad, Kerala
 Fantasy World, Kolkata
 Fun N Food Village, Gurgaon, New Delhi
 Fun N Food Park, NAGPUR
 Funcity, Panchkula
 Funtasia Water Park, Patna
 Jal Vihar, Hyderabad
 Juckies, Kannur, Kerala
 Jungle Water Park, Kanpur, Uttar Pradesh
 Blue World, Mandhana, Kanpur
 Sports Village, Bithoor, Kanpur
 Ekta Water Park, Kanpur
 Hungama World, Patna
 Water Island (Fantasy Motels), Kanpur Lucknow Hwy, Unnao
 Kishkinta, Chennai
 Kovai Kondattam, Coimbatore, Tamil Nadu
 Maharaja Theme Park, Coimbatore, Tamil Nadu
 Manasa Water Park, Mangalore
 Merry Kingdom, Kannur, Kerala
 Nature Park, Kolkata
 Nicco Park, Kolkata
 Ocean Park, Hyderabad
 Pink City Water Park, Jaipur
 Rose Valley Amusement Parks, Kolkata
 Sentosa, Pune
 Savin Kingdom, Siliguri, West Bengal
 Somanipuram Adventure Park, Indore
 Splashdown Waterpark Goa, Anjuna, Goa
 Splash-The Water Park Delhi, Alipur, Delhi
 Splash-The Fun World Ahmedabad, Ahmedabad, Gujarat
 Splash-The Suncity Gwalior, Gwalior, Madhya Pradesh
 Splash-The Resorts Hisar, Hisar, Haryana
 Splash Water World, Rohtak, Haryana
 Tikuji-Ni-Wadi, Thane, Maharashtra
 Vanraj water park, Junagadh, Gujarat
 Vismaya, Kannur, Kerala
 Water Kingdom, Gorai, Mumbai
 Wet N' Joy Water Park, Lonavala
 Wonderla, Kochi, Bangalore and Hyderabad
 Worlds of Wonder Water Park, Noida
 Shanku's Water Park & Resort, Mehsana Gujarat
 Swapna srushti water park, Gandhinagar Gujarat
 Heaven water world, Gondal gujarat
 Nilansh Waterpark, Lucknow
 Enjoy city, Borsad Gujarat

Indonesia 
 Waterbom Park, Tuban, Bali, and Jakarta
 Ciputra Waterpark, Surabaya
 Jogja Bay Adventure Pirates Waterpark, Yogyakarta – the biggest waterpark in Indonesia
 Kediri Waterpark, Kediri – has the longest race slide in Asia
 Taman Wisata Matahari Waterpark at Taman Wisata Matahari, Bogor
 Atlantis Water Adventures, Ancol, Jakarta
 Waterboom Bali, Bali

Iran 

 Ocean Water Park, Kish Island
 Azadegan Water Park, Tehran
 Opark water park, Tehran
 Aftab Water Park, Mashhad
 Iranian Water Park, Mashhad
 Moj-Haye Khoroshan water park, Mashhad
 Padide Water Park, Mashhad
 Water Wave's Land, Mashhad
 Dehkade Abi Pars, Karaj
 Persian water park, Karaj
 Supark water park, Karaj
 Danesh water park, Karaj
 Aria water park, Karaj
 Foruzan water park, Shiraz
 Kosar water park, Shiraz
 Morvarid water park, Shiraz
 Tabriz aqua park, Tabriz
 Helya water park, Tabriz
 Khavaran water park, Tabriz
 Absar water park, Isfahan
 Saadi water park, Isfahan
 Nazhvan water park, Isfahan
 Pardis aqua park, Babol
 Abotab water park, Qom
 Mysterious castle water park, Bandar Abbas
 Ahvaz water park, Ahvaz
 Baran Blue waves water park, Yazd

Israel 
 Yamit 2000 Spark Water Park, Holon
 Meymadion, Tel Aviv
 Shefayim Water Park, Kibbutz Shefayim – Israel's largest water park
 Luna Gal, Tiberias
 Nachshonit Park, Kibbutz Nachshonim

Japan 
 Hirakata Park, Hirakata, Osaka
 Nagashima Spa Land, Kuwana city, Mie Prefecture – large waterpark and spa 30 minutes away from Nagoya city
 Space World, Yahatahigashi-ku, Kitakyūshū
 Toshimaen Amusement Park, Nerima, Tokyo
 Yokohama Hakkeijima Sea Paradise, Kanazawa-ku, Yokohama
 Yomiuriland, Tokyo
 Summerland, Tokyo

Kuwait 
 Aqua Park, Kuwait City
Bay Zero, Kuwait City      
 Messila Water Village, Messila Beach

Laos 
 Vientiane Ocean Park, Vientiane

Malaysia 

 A' Famosa Resort, Malacca
 Bukit Merah Laketown Water Park, Perak
 Carnival Water Park, Kedah
 ESCAPE Waterplay, Penang
 Gold Coast Morib Themes Water Park, Sepang
 Bukit Gambang Waterpark, Pahang
 Legoland Water Park, Johor Bahru
 Lost World of Tambun, Ipoh
 Melaka Wonderland, Malacca
 Stampak Water park, Kuching
 Sunway Lagoon, Subang Jaya
 Tasik kenyir Water Park, Terengganu
 Tiara Beach Resort, Port Dickson
 Tiram Indoor Water Park, Johor Bahru
 Water World@I-City, Shah Alam
 Wet World Hot Spring, Pedas

Myanmar 
 Yangon Water Boom, Yangon

Pakistan 
 Sozo Water Park, Lahore

Palestinian Territories 
 Crazy Water Park, Gaza
 Water Land, Jericho

Philippines 

 8 Waves Waterpark and Resort, Baliwag, Bulacan
 Adventure Beach Waterpark, Subic Bay Freeport, Zambales
 Amana Waterpark, Pandi, Bulacan
 Aqua Planet, Clark Freeport Zone, Pampanga
 Aquaria Water Park, Calatagan, Batangas
 Fontana Water Theme Park, Clark Freeport Zone, Pampanga
 Jed's Island Resort, Calumpit, Bulacan
 Jpark Island Resort & Waterpark, Lapu-Lapu City, Cebu
 Seven Seas Waterpark and Resort, Opol, Misamis Oriental
 Splash Island, Biñan, Laguna
 Waterworld Cebu, Mandaue City, Cebu
 Campuestohan Highland Resort,  Talisay City Negros Occidental
 Splash Park, Bacolod City Negros Occidental

Russia 
 Aquamarine, Khanty-Mansi Autonomous Okrug, Surgut
 Aquamir, Novosibirsk

Singapore 
 Wild Wild Wet, Pasir Ris

South Korea 
 Caribbean Bay, Yongin (part of Everland Resort)
 Lotte Water Park, Gimhae, Gyeongsangnam-do (part of Lotte World)
 Ocean World, Hongcheon-gun, Gangwon-do, Korea
 Sun Beach Water Park, Ch'angwon Gyeongsangnam-do
 Woongjin Playdoci, Bucheon-si, Gyeonggi-do, Korea

Taiwan 
 Formosa Fun Coast, Bali, New Taipei City
 Taipei Water Park, Taipei

Thailand 

 A-Nature, Phitsanulok
 Ayutthaya Water Park, Phra Nakhon Si Ayutthaya
 Banharn Slider Water Park, Suphan Buri
 Black Mountain Water Park, Hua Hin
 Cartoon Network Amazone, Chonburi
 Phrom Paradise, Chiang Mai
 Chat Trakan Waterpark, Phitsanulok
 Chiang Mai Zoo Water Park, Chiang Mai
 Chiang Rai Park Resort, Chiang Rai
 Coco Splash Adventure and Water Park, Samui
 Dictionary Park, Maha Sarakham
 Dino Water Park, Khon Kaen
 Dreamer Water Park, Sa Kaeo
 Fantasia Lagoon Water Park, Bangkok, Nakhon Ratchasima and Nonthaburi
 Fighter Jet Water Park, Nakhon Si Thammarat
 Funny Park at Play La Ploen, Buriram
 The Hero Water Park, Nong Khai
 Jungle Water Park, Pathum Thani
 Jurassic Water Park, Nakhon Pathom
 Kaimook Waterpark, Samut Songkhram
 Khaoyai Fantasy Water Park, Nakhon Ratchasima
 Khaw Sri Wong Waterpark – Slider, Phetchabun
 Korat Zoo Lagoon, Nakhon Ratchasima
 Leoland Water Park, Bangkok
 Mae Fung, Chaiyaphum
 MahaSamutr Hua Hin, Prachuap Khiri Khan
 MJ Waterpark, Phetchabun
 Mukdahan Waterpark- Golf Country, Mukdahan
 P Land Water Park, Sakon Nakhon
 Paradise Park, Samut Prakan
 Pattaya Park Funny Land & Water Park, Chonburi
 Phetrat Water Park and Pool, Saraburi
 Phuket Aquapark, Phuket
 Phukradueng Waterpark & Zoo, Loei
 The Pirates Park, Surat Thani
 Playport Udon Thani Water Park, Udon Thani
 Play Park Buriram, Buriram
 Pooh Paeng Water Park, Maha Sarakham
 Pororo Water Park, Bangkok
 Ramayana Water Park, Chonburi
 The Resort Water Park, Ratchaburi
 Santorini Water Fantasy, Cha-am
 Saran Water Park, Surin
 Scenical World, Nakhon Ratchasima
 Sea Paradise, Lampang
 Siam Park City, Bangkok
 Songkhla Zoo Water Park, Songkhla
 Space Water Park, Chainat
 Splash Jungle Water Park, Phuket
 The Splash Water Park, Ubon Ratchathani
 Splashdown Waterpark, Chonburi
 Star Tiger Zoo and Water Park, Chaiyaphum
 The Sun Water Park, Lamphun
 Surat Waterpark, Surat Thani
 Thanakorn Water Park, Nakhon Sawan
 Thonglor Waterpark, Ubon Ratchathani
 Tube Trek Waterpark, Chiang Mai
 Udon Water World, Udon Thani
 Usotel Waterland, Udon Thani
 Vana Nava Water Park, Hua Hin
 Water Fun Dream World, Pathum Thani
 Water Park Roi-Et, Roi Et
 Water Wonder Park, Ubon Ratchathani
 West Wonder Waterpark, Kanchanaburi

United Arab Emirates 

 Aquaventure Waterpark, Emirate of Dubai (part of Atlantis The Palm, Dubai)
 Dreamland Aqua Park, Emirate of Umm al-Quwain
 Wild Wadi Water Park, Jumeirah, Emirate of Dubai
 Yas Waterworld, Yas Island, Emirate of Abu Dhabi
 Al Montazah Water Park, Emirate of Sharjah
 Jungle Bay Water Park, Emirate of Dubai

See also 
List of water parks
List of amusement parks in Asia

References 

Lists of amusement parks
Asia-related lists
Lists of tourist attractions in Asia
Lists of buildings and structures in Asia